James Graham-Campbell (born 1947) is a British archaeologist. He is Emeritus Professor of Medieval Archaeology at University College London and a fellow of the British Academy.

Principal publications

 Viking artefacts: a select catalogue 1980
 The Viking-Age gold and silver of Scotland (AD 850-1100) 1995
 Vikings in Scotland: an archaeological survey 1998
 The Archaeology of Medieval Europe, Volume 1 :Eighth to Twelfth Centuries AD 2007
 Viking Art 2013

References

External links
 

Living people
Academics of University College Dublin
Academics of University College London
British archaeologists
Fellows of the British Academy
1947 births
Place of birth missing (living people)